Sefis Anastasakos (died 25 January 2010) was a Greek politician, author, lawyer and activist.

Death
On 25 January 2010 he died of cancer.

References

2010 deaths
Greek politicians
20th-century Greek lawyers
Greek activists
Year of birth missing
People from Karditsa (regional unit)